Ross Kelly may refer to:

Ross Kelly (footballer), Australian rules footballer for West Perth and inaugural chairman of the Fremantle Football Club
Ross Kelly (soccer) player for Austin Aztex
Ross Kelly (presenter), Scottish TV presenter
Ross Kelly (actor) in Klown Kamp Massacre

See also
Ross O'Carroll-Kelly, fictional Irish character